Blobotics is a term describing research into chemical-based computer processors based on ions rather than electrons. Andrew Adamatzky, a computer scientist at the University of the West of England, Bristol used the term in an article in New Scientist March 28, 2005 .  

The aim is to create 'liquid logic gates' which would be 'infinitely reconfigurable and self-healing'.  The process relies on the Belousov–Zhabotinsky reaction, a repeating cycle of three separate sets of reactions.  Such a processor could form the basis of a robot which, using artificial sensors, interact with its surroundings in a way which mimics living creatures. 

The coining of the term was featured by ABC radio in Australia .

References

 Motoike I., Adamatzky A. "Three-valued logic gates in reaction-diffusion excitable media." Chaos, Solitons & Fractals 24 (2005) 107-114
 Adamatzky, A. "Collision-based computing in Belousov–Zhabotinsky medium." Chaos, Solitons & Fractals 21:(5), (2004), p1259-1264  

Robotics
Classes of computers